Lamar Louis (born October 2, 1993) is an American football linebacker who is currently a free agent. He played college football at Louisiana State and was signed as an undrafted free agent by the Arizona Cardinals in 2016.

High school career
Louis attended Breaux Bridge High School where he played high school football as both a running back and linebacker. As a senior, he rushed the ball 43 times for 293 yards and one touchdown. On defense, he recorded 37 solo tackles, two sacks, one interception, one fumble recovery, and one forced fumble.

Louis was named a member of the ESPN All-Louisiana Football Team. He was also a 2011 LSWA Class 4A All-State offensive honorable mention. He was selected to the 2011 Press-Register Super Southeast 120. He was named to the 2012 Times Picayune Blue-Chip list. he was ranked #111 in the 2012 final Scout.com Southeast Top 150. He was a four-star prospect according to ESPN.com, Rivals.com, 247sports.com and Scout.com. He was also rated as Louisiana’s #6 prospect by ESPN.com and 247sports.com, and #7 by Rivals.com. He was ranked as the nation’s #10 athlete (someone who plays on both offense and defense) by ESPN.com, and #18 by Rivals.com.

College career
Louis then attended Louisiana State University, where he majored in sports administration.

As a freshman in 2012, he appeared in 11 games with five starts. He finished the season with 13 tackles, of which five were solo, and two quarterback hurries. He started the final five games of the season due to injuries to Luke Muncie and Kwon Alexander. As a sophomore in 2013, he appeared in all 13 games of the season as a back-up to D. J. Welter. He recorded 25 tackles (11 solo) and two fumble recoveries. As a junior in 2014, he appeared in 12 games, with 10 starts at Sam linebacker. He recorded 29 tackles, 2.5 tackles-for-loss and one forced fumble. As a senior in 2015, he appeared in 12 games with two starts. He recorded 30 tackles and one tackle-for-loss.

Professional career

Arizona Cardinals
After going unselected in the 2016 NFL Draft, Louis signed with the Arizona Cardinals. He was released on September 14, 2016.

New Orleans Saints
On November 1, 2016, Louis signed with the New Orleans Saints. He was released on December 6, 2016.

Baltimore Ravens
On December 13, 2016, Louis was signed by the Baltimore Ravens. He was waived on August 20, 2017.

Dallas Cowboys
On August 25, 2017, Louis was signed by the Dallas Cowboys. He was waived on September 2, 2017.

Personal life
Louis is the son of Redell and Kennedy Louis. Louis married LSU basketball player Raigyne Moncrief in July 2017.

References

External links
 LSU tigers bio
 Arizona Cardinals bio

1993 births
Living people
People from Breaux Bridge, Louisiana
Players of American football from Louisiana
American football linebackers
LSU Tigers football players
Arizona Cardinals players
New Orleans Saints players
Baltimore Ravens players
Dallas Cowboys players